Bosch Rexroth AG is an engineering firm based in Lohr am Main in Germany. It is the result of a merger on 1 May 2001 between Mannesmann Rexroth AG and the Automation Technology Business Unit of Robert Bosch GmbH, and is a wholly owned subsidiary of Robert Bosch GmbH.  Bosch Rexroth employs over 31,000 people worldwide, and achieved total revenue of 6.2 billion euro in 2021.

Products and markets
Bosch Rexroth manufactures products and systems associated with the control and motion of industrial and mobile equipment.

In 2017, the company announced a partnership with Trumpf and Heraeus to build servo valves using the former's TruPrint 5000 laser powder additive manufacturing machines to build a servo valve.

References

External links 

Engineering companies of Germany
Companies based in Bavaria
German companies established in 1795
Manufacturing companies established in 1795
German brands
Manufacturing companies of Germany
Robert Bosch GmbH
Bearing manufacturers
Pump manufacturers